Art Camacho is an American film director, producer, actor and stuntman. His directorial work includes  Recoil in 1998, 13 Dead Men in 2003, Confessions of a Pit Fighter in 2005 and  Half Past Dead 2 in 2007; Assassin X in 2016, and Wild League in 2018,. His acting work includes  Chinatown Connection in 1990, The Power Within in 1995, Tiger Heart in 1996 and Little Bigfoot 2: The Journey Home. Camacho's autobiography  "A filmmaker's Journey" was published in 2017.

Background
Camacho started out  producing and directing commercials before moving into directing, choreographing and producing action films. By 2015, he had worked in at least 50 action films as either stuntman or choreographer. One of the films he has directed is Recoil which is from PM Entertainment, the company responsible for many of the direct to video action films in the 1990s to early 2000s. Camacho went on to write, producer and direct several other films. Camacho's credits include Seized starring Scott Adkins, Dead Trigger starring Dolph Lundgren, Half Past Dead starring Steven Seagal. He also directed his first film in Russia: Wild League. One of Camacho's influences is Eric Lee.

Filmography

References

External links
 Imdb: Art Camacho

American male film actors
Film directors from Los Angeles
Male actors from Los Angeles
1965 births
Living people